Peter Gartland (14 May 1893 – June 1973) was an English professional footballer who made one appearance as a left back in the Football League for Manchester City. At the time of his death in June 1973, Gartland was the last living member of Manchester City's final pre-war squad.

Personal life 
Gartland served as a gunner in the Royal Field Artillery during the First World War. In September 1918, he received a small shrapnel wound in the leg from a gas shell, which necessitated the leg being amputated.

Career statistics

References

External links 

 

1893 births
English footballers
English Football League players
British Army personnel of World War I
Royal Field Artillery soldiers
Manchester City F.C. players
Sportspeople from Seaham
Footballers from County Durham
Association football fullbacks
Seaham Harbour F.C. players
1973 deaths
English amputees